Springfield Police Department may refer to:

 Springfield Police Department (Florida)
 Springfield Police Department (Georgia)
 Springfield Police Department (Illinois)
 Springfield Police Department (Massachusetts)
 Springfield Police Department (Minnesota)
 Springfield Police Department (Missouri)
 Springfield Police Department (New Jersey)
 Springfield Police Department (Ohio)
 Springfield Police Department (Oregon)
 Springfield Police Department (Tennessee)
 Springfield Police Department (Vermont)
 Springfield Police Service (Manitoba, Canada)
 Springfield Township Police Department (Ohio)
 Springfield Township Police Department (Pennsylvania)
 Springfield Department of Public Safety (Michigan)
 West Springfield Police Department (Massachusetts)